Audubon Park (historically ) is a municipal park located in the Uptown neighborhood of New Orleans, Louisiana, in the United States. It is approximately 350 acres. The park is approximately six miles to the west of the city center of New Orleans and sits on land that was purchased by the city in 1871. It is bordered on one side by the Mississippi River and on the other by St. Charles Avenue, directly across from Loyola University and Tulane University. The park is named in honor of artist and naturalist John James Audubon, who began living in New Orleans in 1821.

History and features

The land now housing the park was a plantation during the French and Spanish colonial periods and early American statehood. It belonged to Étienne de Boré, the first mayor of New Orleans and the first successful sugar planter in Louisiana; his plantation also included what is now the location of Tulane University and Audubon Zoo.

It was used by both the Confederate and the Union armies in the American Civil War, and as a staging area for the Buffalo Soldiers. At the time of its establishment, it was the last large undeveloped parcel of what was to become uptown New Orleans. The area was annexed by the City of New Orleans, along with the surrounding communities of Jefferson City and Greenville in 1870, and the following year the city purchased the land.

Use as an urban park was intended from the start, with "Upper City Park" originally selected as a name to distinguish the park from City Park, but few improvements occurred in the first decade.  The nascent park accommodated a World's Fair soon thereafter, the World Cotton Centennial of 1884.  After the closing of the fair, the park's development began in earnest.  Most of the fair's buildings were demolished, with the exception of Horticultural Hall, which remained in the park until destroyed in the 1915 New Orleans hurricane.  The only notable reminder of the fair to remain in the park in the 21st century is a large iron ore rock from the Alabama State exhibit (which in local lore has often been misidentified as a meteorite).  Audubon Park's present form largely follows a design drafted by John Charles Olmsted, a principal of the renowned Olmsted Brothers landscape architecture practice.

Early in the 20th century, part of the park became home to the Audubon Zoo.  The zoo received significant improvement at the hands of the Works Progress Administration, and again from the 1970s onwards.	
Numerous early- and mid-20th century park attractions like the miniature railway, the enormous Whitney Young public swimming pool, the swan boats in the lagoons, and the carousel were closed, dismantled and/or discontinued in the 1970s, though a far smaller public pool was constructed in the 1990s adjacent to the site of the original Young pool.

The park features sports fields and picnic facilities along the Mississippi River, in an area called Riverview Park. This riverside portion of Audubon Park is known colloquially as "The Fly", an almost-forgotten reference to the modernist, butterfly-shaped river viewing shelter constructed in the 1960s and demolished in the 1980s in the aftermath of its severe damage one foggy morning at the hands of blundering river traffic.

The ring road around the park was closed to automobile traffic at the start of the 1980s and became a popular  walking, jogging and biking route. A 2.2 mile dirt path located around the perimeter of the park is also popular for runners seeking a less congested route.

A few of the park's old live oak trees were blown down when Hurricane Katrina hit the city in 2005, but as the park is wholly located on high ground comprising the Mississippi River's natural levee, it was spared the flooding experienced by the majority of the city after Katrina. Audubon Park was used as a makeshift helicopter port and encampment for National Guard troops and relief workers after the storm.

Athletic facilities
In 1898 the Audubon golf course opened within the park. In 2002, the golf course was renovated and converted to a mostly Par 3 executive course, to complaints from many non-golfing users of the park, who alleged that the original Olmsted Brothers design was being desecrated.  The Heymann Memorial Conservatory, closed for many years prior, was demolished to accommodate the golf course renovation and new golf clubhouse.  Also in 2002, the New Orleans city council renamed the park's "Avenger Field" to "David Berger - Avenger Field" in memory of David Mark Berger, an athlete and graduate of Tulane University who was captured and killed in the 1972 Olympic Games hostage crisis. The field was officially dedicated to Berger's memory on June 10, 2013.

Wildlife 

Ochsner Island on the east side of the park features a rookery that is one of the prime birding spots in Greater New Orleans.  The island attracts hundreds of wading birds, including great egrets, cattle egrets, snowy egrets, ibis, little blue herons, green herons, night herons and others.  The park is also home to diving double-crested cormorants and anhingas, as well as to many species of ducks.  Recently, black-bellied whistling ducks have begun using the park's lagoons as a stopover on their migrations.

References

External links

Audubon Park
Fodor's Online Travel Guide
Vintage Audubon Park post cards
Images of the Live Oaks in Audubon Park

Parks in New Orleans
Uptown New Orleans
World's fair sites in Louisiana
Works Progress Administration in Louisiana
1871 establishments in Louisiana